Just Jillian is an American reality television series starring Jillian Michaels. The series premiered on January 19, 2016, on E!.

Episodes

References

External links
 

2010s American reality television series
2016 American television series debuts
2016 American television series endings
E! original programming